Exastilithoxus is a small genus of suckermouth armored catfish native to South America.

Species
There are currently two recognized species in this genus:
 Exastilithoxus fimbriatus (Steindachner, 1915)
 Exastilithoxus hoedemani Isbrücker & Nijssen, 1985

Appearance and anatomy
Exastilithoxus species are small, cylindrical loricariids.

These species exhibit a round lower lip with fleshy barbels. Color pattern is generally mottled and dark brown with paler areas under and just posterior to the dorsal fin. The abdomen is white, fins are mottled, and the ventral surface of the caudal peduncle is colored as the sides, but slightly lighter. Like other loricariids, the body is armored, however the abdomen is naked.

Ecology
Exastilithoxus species are unique among loricariids in that they subsist entirely on insect larvae.

References

Ancistrini
Fish of South America
Catfish genera
Taxa named by Isaäc J. H. Isbrücker
Taxa named by Han Nijssen
Freshwater fish genera